Antron is a genus of gall wasps in the tribe Cynipini, the oak gall wasps. Some authors have included it within the genus Cynips but it was recently resurrected. The genus was established by Alfred Kinsey in 1930.

Species
Species in this genus include:
 Antron lovellae Melika, Nicholls & Stone, 2021
 Antron tomkursari Melika, Nicholls & Stone, 2021

References

Cynipidae
Hymenoptera genera
Gall-inducing insects

Taxa described in 1930
Taxa named by Alfred Kinsey